Erik Larsson (May 29, 1918 – 2005) was a Swedish politician of the Centre Party.

References
This article was initially translated from the Swedish Wikipedia article.

Centre Party (Sweden) politicians
1918 births
2005 deaths